MV Elwha was a  in the Washington State Ferry System. The  vessel entered service in June 1968, and spent most of her career working the Anacortes-San Juan Islands-Sidney B.C. route.

History

Elwha was built in 1967 in San Diego, California, as the last of the four Super-class ferries.

For much of the 1970s, the Elwha served as a maintenance relief vessel, filling in for other Super and Jumbo-class ferries when and where needed for maintenance cycles.

In the 1980s, Elwha was assigned to the Anacortes-San Juan Islands route, where she stayed, with rare exception, until her retirement in 2020.

On October 2, 1983, the Elwha ran aground in Grindstone Harbor, near Orcas Island, on a submerged reef while carrying 100 passengers. The collision was initially blamed on the failure of a steering component, but was later found to have been caused by Captain Billy Fittro going off-course to give a visitor a view of her waterfront home. The captain resigned in lieu of being discharged a few days after the incident; ferry chief Nick Tracey was fired the following month, after failing to report Captain Fittro's past negligence. The collision caused $250,000 in damage and forced the ferry out of service for several weeks. The rock was later named "Elwha Rock" in 1989 after the ferry; the incident also inspired the song "Elwha on the Rocks", performed by the Island City Jazz Band.

In December 1990, a winter storm descended on the Puget Sound region while the Elwha was out of service for routine maintenance. Hurricane-force winds ripped mooring lines and repeatedly slammed the now partially adrift ferry into the concrete pier it was tied up alongside. The accident resulted in millions of dollars in damage and forever altered the ferry.

On September 8, 1999, the vessel suffered another serious accident when a software glitch led to it ramming the Orcas Island ferry dock, causing $3.8 million worth of damage to the linkspan and other terminal structures.

In April 2018, an inspection of the ferry uncovered  of corroded steel beneath the floor of the Elwhas main passenger cabin. Repairs to the ferry took seven months and cost $25 million dollars.

 
In July 2019, just eight months after her return to service, another routine inspection at Lake Union Drydock uncovered further steel corrosion on the ferry's car deck. Repairs were estimated at $12 million, and the ferry was placed in layup while WSF attempted to procure the necessary funding to repair the ferry. Following the passage of I-976 in November 2019, the State Legislature proposed to retire the ferry rather than fund the repairs. On April 17, 2020, following seven months of layup, the ferry was towed to Bainbridge Island to be taken out of service.

References

External links
Vessel info from WSDOT

Washington State Ferries vessels
1967 ships